Mlandvo Shongwe (born 20 September 1993) is a Swazi sprinter who specializes in the 100 and 200 metres.

He reached the "Final B" of the 200 metres at the 2010 Youth Olympics. He competed 100 and 200 metres event at the 2014 Commonwealth Games without reaching the semi-final, and at the 2015 African Games he competed 100 metres and 200 metres in semi-final. At the 2016 African Championships he reached the semi-final in the 100 metres but missed the final of the 4 × 100 metres relay.

His personal best times are 10.57 seconds in the 100 metres, achieved in May 2016 in Bloemfontein; and 21.32 seconds in the 200 metres, achieved at the African Games 2015 in Brazzaville.

References

1993 births
Living people
Swazi male sprinters
Athletes (track and field) at the 2010 Summer Youth Olympics
Commonwealth Games competitors for Eswatini
Athletes (track and field) at the 2014 Commonwealth Games
Athletes (track and field) at the 2015 African Games
African Games competitors for Eswatini